War Dancer is a comic book series published by Defiant Comics, from February 1994 until July 1994.

The series was created and illustrated by Alan Weiss and co-written by Weiss and comics author, creator and one time former editor-in-chief of Marvel Comics and Valiant Comics, Jim Shooter.

The series spanned a total of six issues until Defiant ceased its publication in the summer of 1994.

Plot
War Dancer features a storyline that includes many elements of the Aztec culture, including names and places (Quetzalcoatl) as well as Aztec-related armor and jewelry that the Dancer wears on his neck and helmet.

The story follows a prince from another world who uses rain dancing to summon the end of worlds, to speed up the end of all things in order to bring back his one true love. The prince (Dancer) is not a typical 'super hero' in terms of good/evil, and Alan Weiss' character is a unique and original creation.

The character has problems with the heroic super-powered Charles Smith.

References

1994 comics debuts
Defiant Comics titles